Ghedin is an Italian surname. Notable people with the surname include:

Elodie Ghedin (born 1967), Canadian American parasitologist and virologist
Pietro Ghedin (born 1952), Italian football coach and former player 
Riccardo Ghedin (born 1985), Italian tennis player

Italian-language surnames